The men's trap, team (originally called clay bird shooting, team competition) was a shooting sports event held as part of the shooting at the 1912 Summer Olympics programme. It was the second appearance of the event, which had been introduced in 1908. The competition was held from Saturday, 29 June 1912 to Monday, 1 July 1912.

Thirty-six sport shooters from six nations competed.

Results

References

External links
 
 

Shooting at the 1912 Summer Olympics